Tereneyevo is a rural locality (a selo) in Pavlovskoye Rural Settlement, Suzdalsky District, Vladimir Oblast, Russia. The population was 17 as of 2010. There are 4 streets.

Geography 
Tereneyevo is located 15 km south of Suzdal (the district's administrative centre) by road. Semyonovskoye-Krasnoye is the nearest rural locality.

References 

Rural localities in Suzdalsky District